Maya Nasr (Arabic: مايا نصر; born April 22, 1997) is a Lebanese researcher and a PhD student in the Department of Aeronautics and Astronautics at the Massachusetts Institute of Technology. Her research areas include aerospace engineering and international space law, policy, and politics.

Early life and education

Maya Nasr was born in Chouf, Lebanon. She studied at Shouf National College in Baakline, Mount Lebanon, where she graduated with honors and earned a Baccalaureate in General Sciences in 2014.

During that year, she got accepted into MIT at the age of 16, after receiving the Diana Kamal Scholarship Search Fund scholarship and being part of the Education USA Competitive College Club at Amideast.
Nasr mentions that having the chance to study in the USA opened a vast array of opportunities that lead to where she is now.

In 2018, she graduated with a bachelor's degree in Aerospace, Aeronautical, and Astronautical Engineering.
In 2021, she received her master's degree in Aerospace Engineering.
She is currently pursuing her PhD on the MOXIE project under the supervision of former NASA astronaut Jeffrey A. Hoffman.

Career

Research on MOXIE
In 2016, Nasr, then a junior student, started working in the MOXIE team, under the supervision of Jeffrey Hoffman, as part of MIT’s Advanced Undergraduate Research Program (SuperUROP), along with researchers from the Haystack Observatory, NASA's Jet Propulsion Lab and the Department of Aeronautics and Astronautics at MIT, as part of the Mars 2020 Perseverance mission.

For her master’s thesis, Nasr conducted a wide range of tests under pressures and temperatures similar to those of Mars in order to calibrate and characterize the sensors of the MOXIE, with the intention of understanding their performance on Mars.

In 2021, the NASA rover carrying MOXIE landed on Mars after over 7 months of space travel. Since then, Nasr is the Science Payload Downlink Lead (sPDL) for the Mars 2020 Perseverance rover operations of the MOXIE instrument. Nasr's ongoing PhD thesis, to be submitted by 2023, focuses on the process of maturation of technology from concept to flight, including the role of rideshare and other flight validation opportunities.

International Space Law and Policy
Nasr is the Policy Lead and the Congressional Legislation Lead for the Space Generation Advisory Council (SGAC) Taskforce on US Space Policy. She’s also the research coordinator of the Space Law & Policy Project Group, and the lead of the Space Resources and Space Ethics & Human Rights subgroups of the Space Law & Policy project group with the goal of space disarmament and peaceful use of outer space.

In 2020, Nasr was part of the United Nations Office for Outer Space Affairs (UNOOSA) Space4Women program, which seeks to promote the peaceful use and exploration of space, and the use of space technology for sustainable socio-economic development.

In 2021, in an article published in the Journal Jus Ad Astra, Nasr expressed concern about climate change and how the emergence of space and satellite technology has revolutionized humanity’s ability to monitor the health of the planet, from upper atmospheric layers to surface measurements.

Advocacy and activism
Nasr has supported many different causes within her research projects. In her media appearances, she has discussed the struggles she overcame and those she has to go through in her journey. Nasr is a co-founder of Humanity United with MIT Art and Nanotechnology in Space (HUMANS), which aims to send a message into space that the cosmos is for everyone. The project is set to be launched next year to the International Space Station (ISS) in partnership with the MIT Space Exploration Initiative (SEI).

In an interview with Future TV in November 2015, Nasr pointed out that it is a rare occurrence "where the department accepts students from the Arab region, unless they hold the US citizenship". She added that women are able to reach the highest levels in science.

In April 2021, in an interview with the MIT Arab Alumni Association, on the podcast "UnliMITed", she discussed how Aeronautical Engineering has pushed the boundaries set for young Arab women. She also sent a message to all the other women and Arab women that wish to make it, telling them that anything is possible with determination.

In a TEDxMIT conference in May 2021 entitled "Your passport – an open door to opportunity, or a lifetime lockout?", Nasr described how she struggles because of her passport, and how it imposes limitations that continuously stop her from fully investing all what she has learned and all her passion for the exploration of space. She emphasized on how her passport has been and continues to be an obstacle in her life, but one should still work even harder for it not to be.

In May 2021, Nasr was featured on the Simply Youth Podcast, in their "Girl Meets World" episode, in which she advocated in favor of expanding space exploration and ensuring the adequate use of space.

In an interview with Jenn White for NPR, Nasr stressed the fact that many international students face uncertainty regarding the possibility of completing their degrees, and fear deportation as a result of potential procedures taken the Trump Administration during the COVID-19 crisis.

Awards and recognition
In 2012, Nasr got awarded the Diana Kamal Scholarship Search Fund (DKSSF) scholarship as part of the "Competitive College Club" in Amideast.

The Yvnge Raustein Award (2015),  the MIT10 Scholarship from the MIT Alumni Association (2016), the MIT Advanced Undergraduate Research in Aeronautics and Astronautics Award (2017), MIT Rene H. Miller Prize for Excellence in Systems Engineering (2018), AIAA Best Paper Award for her paper “Evolutions of the Flight Crew and Mission Control Relationship” (2020), and the Gerald A. Soffen Memorial Fund for the Advancement of Space (2021) are a number of awards she has won during her career.

References

1997 births
Massachusetts Institute of Technology alumni
Living people
Lebanese emigrants to the United States